The 2003 French Grand Prix (formally the LXXXIX Mobil 1 Grand Prix de France) was a Formula One motor race held on 6 July 2003 at the Circuit de Nevers Magny-Cours. It was the tenth race of the 2003 Formula One season. The 70-lap race was won by Ralf Schumacher driving for the Williams team after starting from pole position, which would turn out to be his last race win in Formula One. Juan Pablo Montoya finished second in the other Williams car, with Michael Schumacher third driving for Ferrari. Ralf Schumacher's victory was his second consecutive win of the season having won the preceding European Grand Prix at the Nürburgring.

As a consequence of the race, Michael Schumacher extended his lead in the World Drivers' Championship to eight points over Kimi Räikkönen, with Ralf Schumacher a further three points behind. In the World Constructors' Championship, Williams reduced the gap to Ferrari from thirteen points to three points.

This was the first French Grand Prix held at the upgraded version of Magny-Cours, having made Château d'Eau a sharper right hand corner, and a complete modification of the Lycée section, becoming a very sharp right hand turn after the back straight which then leads to a difficult final chicane next to the pit entrance. The pit lane was also significantly shortened as a result of the upgrades.

Classification 
Jos Verstappen ended up quickest after the first qualifying session due to a drying track. This was the only time a Minardi topped the timesheets at a race weekend. His teammate Justin Wilson's time after Q1 was deleted after scrutineering found his car was 2 kg underweight. It was 1:20.968 which at the time was good enough for 2nd place giving Minardi a 1–2.

Qualifying

Race

Championship standings after the race 

Drivers' Championship standings

Constructors' Championship standings

Note: Only the top five positions are included for both sets of standings.

References

External links 

Comments on 2003 French GP

French Grand Prix
Grand Prix
French Grand Prix
French Grand Prix